The Cartagena Manifesto was written by Simón Bolívar during the Colombian and Venezuelan War of Independence, after the fall of the First Republic, explaining what he believed to be the causes of this loss. It was written in Cartagena de Indias, on 15 December 1812. This is the first of Bolívar's public documents, which due to his later fame as the "Liberator of five nations," have become quite well known. The document contained the conceptual framework of his new agenda, which he then acted out in the field.

Background 
Prior to the document's publication, Bolívar had been an officer in the Venezuelan army. The First Republic, however, was defeated due to a number of movements that confronted and exploited each other such as the royalists who fought for the old order, the supporters of independence who fought for creole supremacy, and the pardos, blacks, and slaves who fought for their liberation. The conflict was exacerbated by a number of factors such as the shortage of provisions and the effects of the 1812 Caracas earthquake, among others. Bolivar started acting on his own, leaving La Guaira on a Spanish ship. He briefly stayed in Curaçao before finally arriving in Cartagena. He accepted a commission in the army of the United Provinces of New Granada (Colombia), which later granted him permission to lead a force to free Venezuela, in what became known as the Admirable Campaign.

The Manifesto 
In Cartagena Manifesto, Bolivar outlined a framework that would prevent New Granada from suffering the fate of Venezuela since the territory reproduced the prevailing pattern of colonial dissent from loyal juntas to independent governments. The political, economic, social, and natural causes which Bolivar mentioned included:

The use of a [federal system], which Bolivar considered weak for a time of war. 
Bad administration of the public income by the republican government
The earthquake of Caracas of 1812, which worsened the economic and political situation
The impossibility of establishing a permanent army due to the intransigence of the general population
The opposing influence of the Roman Catholic Church, which clandestinely promoted anti-republican views

Bolivar advocated a strong central government and powerful executive to avoid infighting between city, state, and national authorities, which in his view created stalemate, dissipating funds and energy. He stated that "the government must necessarily adjust itself, so to speak, to the context of the times, men, and circumstances in which it operates. If these are prosperous and serene, it has to be gentle and protective, but if they are calamitous and turbulent, it has to be severe and armed with a strength equal to the dangers."

References

External links 
 Manifiesto de Cartagena – Analitica.com (text of the Manifesto, in Spanish)
 Manifiesto de Cartagena – Monografías.com (commentary on the Manifesto, in Spanish)

Independence of Colombia
Independence of Venezuela
Simón Bolívar
Colonial Colombia
Colonial Venezuela
Political manifestos
1812 in Colombia
1812 in Venezuela
1812 in the Viceroyalty of New Granada
1812 documents